Jaime Villafuerte (born 26 August 1920) is a Filipino former sports shooter. He competed in the 50 metre rifle, prone event at the 1968 Summer Olympics.

References

External links
 

1920 births
Possibly living people
Filipino male sport shooters
Olympic shooters of the Philippines
Shooters at the 1968 Summer Olympics
People from Cotabato